Robert Richardson (1850–1901) was an Australian journalist, poet and writer for children, possibly the first Australian-born children's writer. He was born in New South Wales, eldest son of John Richardson, a New South Wales politician and store-keeper, and Janet, sister of Peter Nicol Russell.

Richardson completed a B.A. at the University of Sydney and later became well known for his contributions to a number of Sydney and Australian periodicals and newspapers.  He was also a member of the firm of Richardson and Company, an Armidale-based millers and general store-keepers, started by his father.

He left Australia for a life in Edinburgh in 1886 before returning to Sydney around 1894. He died in Armidale on 4 October 1901.

Bibliography

Children's fiction
 Our Junior Mathematical Master; and, A Perilous Errand (1876)
 Black Harry, or, Lost in the Bush (1877)
 The Young Cragsman and Other Stories (1878)
 A Little Australian Girl, or, The Babes in the Bush; and, Jim : A Little Nigger (1881)
 Little Flotsam : A Story for Boys and Girls, and Other Tales (1881)
 The Best of Chums and Other Stories (1881)
 A Lighthouse Keeper for a Night and Other Stories (1881)
 The Hut in the Bush : A Tale of Australian Adventure, and Other Stories (1883)
 Adventurous Boat Voyages (1884)

Poetry
 Willow and Wattle : Poems (1893)
 Annette : Poems (used 1896)

References

Australian poets
Australian children's writers
1850 births
1901 deaths